The Tipping Point is the fifth full-length studio album released by American punk band Authority Zero. It was released on April 2, 2013 through the Hardline Entertainment, a record label owned by Pennywise guitarist Fletcher Dragge. It is the first studio album from the band to feature Brandon Landelius and Sean Sellers on guitar and drums, respectively.  It is also the final album to feature Jeremey Wood on bass, for he left the band a month prior to the album's release.  The Tipping Point peaked at number 15 on Billboard's Top Heatseekers chart.

According to the band, the album is a "taste of the old school and slingshots into new areas and veins of music we have yet to tap into as well as some surprises."

Music videos were made for the songs, "Today We Heard the News", "No Other Place" and "Lift One Up".

Track listing
 "No Other Place" – 2:57
 "Undivided" – 3:18
 "For the Kids" – 4:04
 "Take or Leave It" – 3:14
 "Struggle" – 4:46
 "Lift One Up" – 3:47
 "On the Brink" – 3:20
 "Today We Heard the News" – 4:35
 "The Tipping Point" – 3:24
 "Shakedown in Juarez" – 3:34
 "Endless Roads" – 3:02
 "21st Century Breakout" – 2:56

Personnel
Authority Zero
 Jason DeVore – vocals
 Brandon Landlius – guitar
 Jeremy Wood – bass
 Sean Sellers – drums

Production and recording
 Cameron Webb – producer and mixing
 Jason Livermore – mastering
 Ken Seaton – management

References

Authority Zero albums
2013 albums